Olli Mannermaa (1921–1998) was a Finnish interior architect.  He was born in Turku and had two brothers, Pentti and Esko Mannermaa.

Training 
Interior architect, SIO / Institute for Applied Arts (now University of Art and Design Helsinki), Helsinki, Finland 1949

Exhibitions 
1978 "Muoto-Form" exhibition, Kunsthalle Helsinki
Entered designs at three Milan Triennales
Kilta chair (Martela), MoMa, New York, USA (the Kilta chair has also been included in numerous exhibitions around the world)

Acknowledgments and awards 
1989 Finnish Association of Interior Architects SIO honorary member
1985 Central Chamber of Commerce gold medal
1979 Knight of the Order of the White Rose
1977 State Applied Arts Commission's award
1955 Gold medal at the Finnish general fair for the Kilta chair
1960-1971 Teacher of construction drawing at the Institute for Applied Arts (now University of Art asnd Design Helsinki)

External links 
Kilta-tuoli Martelan sivuilla

1921 births
1998 deaths
People from Turku
Finnish interior designers